Hypotia leonalis is a species of snout moth in the genus Hypotia. It was described by Oberthür in 1887, and is known from Algeria and Tunisia.

The larvae have been recorded feeding on Atriplex halimus.

References

Moths described in 1887
Hypotiini